Pheiroijam Parijat Singh (7 June 1943 – 6 March 2015) was an Indian politician from Manipur, belonging to the Communist Party of India. He was a National Council member of CPI. He had joined CPI in 1964.

He was the Health Minister in the state government. In 2007 he was elected to the Legislative Assembly of Manipur, as the Communist Party of India candidate in the constituency Lamlai. He had been Food and Civil Supplies Minister after the 2002 election. He had been elected from the same Assembly seat in the 2002, 1990 and 1980 elections, finishing second in the 2000, 1995 and 1984 elections.

References

Communist Party of India politicians from Manipur
1943 births
Government of Manipur
2015 deaths
Manipur politicians
Manipur MLAs 1980–1984
Manipur MLAs 1990–1995
Manipur MLAs 2002–2007
Manipur MLAs 2007–2012